Marasmus is a form of severe malnutrition characterized by energy deficiency. It can occur in anyone with severe malnutrition but usually occurs in children. Body weight is reduced to less than 62% of the normal (expected) body weight for the age. Marasmus occurrence increases prior to age 1, whereas kwashiorkor occurrence increases after 18 months. It can be distinguished from kwashiorkor in that kwashiorkor is protein deficiency with adequate energy intake whereas marasmus is inadequate energy intake in all forms, including protein. This clear-cut separation of marasmus and kwashiorkor is however not always clinically evident as kwashiorkor is often seen in a context of insufficient caloric intake, and mixed clinical pictures, called marasmic kwashiorkor, are possible.  Protein wasting in kwashiorkor generally leads to edema and ascites, while muscular wasting and loss of subcutaneous fat are the main clinical signs of marasmus, which makes the ribs and joints protrude.

The prognosis is better than it is for kwashiorkor. Marasmus is the form of nutrition most highly assosciated with HIV, developing in the last stages of pediatric AIDS, and the prognosis for children with co-morbid marasmus and HIV is very poor.

The word "marasmus" comes from the Greek μαρασμός marasmos ("withering").

Signs and symptoms

Marasmus is commonly represented by a shrunken, wasted appearance, loss of muscle mass and subcutaneous fat mass. Buttocks and upper limb muscle groups are usually more affected than others. Edema is not a sign of marasmus and is present in only kwashiorkor and marasmic kwashiorkor. Other symptoms of marasmus include unusual body temperature (hypothermia, pyrexia); anemia; dehydration (as characterized with consistent thirst and shrunken eyes); hypovolemic shock (weak radial pulse; cold extremities; decreased consciousness); tachypnea (pneumonia, heart failure); abdominal manifestations (distension, decreased or metallic bowel sounds; large or small liver; blood or mucus in the stools), ocular manifestations (corneal lesions associated with vitamin A deficiency); dermal manifestations (evidence of infection, purpura, and ear, nose, and throat symptoms (otitis, rhinitis).  Dry skin and brittle hair are also symptoms of marasmus. Marasmus can also make children short-tempered and irritable.

Causes
Marasmus is caused by the following factors:
 Maternal malnutrition
 Maternal anemia
 Poverty
 Pathological conditions in a baby (e.g., diarrhea)
 Pneumonia
 Cyanotic heart diseases
 Malaria
 Necrotizing enterocolitis
 Pyloric stenosis
 Lactose intolerance
 Intussusception
 Meningitis
 Anorexia nervosa

Treatment
Both the causes and complications of the disorder must be treated, including infections, dehydration, and circulation disorders, which are frequently lethal and lead to high mortality if ignored. Initially, the child is fed dried skim milk that has been mixed with boiled water. Once the child tolerates the milk, a vegetable mix can be added including sesame, casein, and sugar. Refeeding must be done slowly to avoid refeeding syndrome. Once children start to recover, they should have more balanced diets which meet their nutritional needs. Children with marasmus commonly develop infections and are consequently treated with antibiotics or other medications. Ultimately, marasmus can progress to the point of no return when the body's ability for protein synthesis is lost. At this point, attempts to correct the disorder by giving food or protein become futile, and death is inevitable.

Epidemiology

United States

In the United States, marasmus is rarely seen, especially in children. In 1995, there were only 228 deaths caused by marasmus in the U.S., of which only 3 were children. In 2016, the prevalence of marasmus in the United States was 0.5%. Prevalence is higher in hospitalized children, especially ones with chronic illnesses, however an exact incidence of nonfatal marasmus is not known. This is due to marasmus not being reported as an admission or discharge diagnosis.

International

There are multiple forms of malnutrition and roughly one-third of the world's population is currently experiencing one or more of them. There are around 50 million children less than five years old who have protein-energy malnutrition. Of the malnourished children population in the world, 80% live in Asia, 15% in Africa, and 5% in Latin America. It is estimated that the prevalence of acute malnutrition in Germany, France, the United Kingdom, and the United States to be 6.1–14%. In Turkey, the prevalence is as high as 32%.

Race

There is no evident racial predisposition that correlates to malnutrition. Rather, there is a strong association with the geographic distribution of poverty.

Age

Marasmus is more commonly seen in children under the age of five due to that age range being characterized as one that has an increase in energy need and susceptibility to viral and bacterial infections. The World Health Organization also identifies the elderly as another population that is vulnerable to malnutrition. Because their nutritional requirement is not well defined, attempts to provide them with the necessary nutrition becomes difficult.

There exists screening tools and tests that can be used to help identify signs and symptoms of malnutrition in older adults. The Malnutrition Screening Tool (MST) is a validated malnutrition screening tool that is primarily used in the residential aged care facility or for adults in the inpatient/outpatient hospital setting. It includes parameters such as weight loss and appetite.
Persons in prisons, concentration camps, and refugee camps are affected more often due to poor nutrition.

See also
Starvation
Cachexia
Emaciation
Kwashiorkor
Protein poisoning

References

External links 

Protein–energy malnutrition